Yevhen Kovalenko (born 11 August 1992) is a Ukrainian football midfielder who plays for Metalurh Zaporizhzhia in Ukrainian First League.

Career
Kovalenko is a product of the youth team system of FC Metalurh Zaporizhzhia. He played for FC Metalurh in the Ukrainian Premier League Reserves and then in the Ukrainian First League sides FC Poltava and MFK Mykolaiv. In January 2016 he signed a contract with Georgian FC Zugdidi from the Umaglesi Liga.

After playing back in Ukraine with Kremin Kremenchuk, Kovalenko moved again abroad in summer 2018, this time to Serbia to play with OFK Žarkovo.

In summer 2018 he moved abroad again, and signed with OFK Žarkovo in Serbian First League. After one season at Serbian second level, in following summer he signed with FK Rad playing in the Serbian SuperLiga.

References

External links
 

1992 births
Living people
Ukrainian footballers
FC Metalurh-2 Zaporizhzhia players
FC Poltava players
MFC Mykolaiv players
Ukrainian expatriate footballers
Expatriate footballers in Georgia (country)
FC Zugdidi players
FC Kramatorsk players
Ukrainian expatriate sportspeople in Georgia (country)
OFK Žarkovo players
Serbian First League players
FK Rad players
Serbian SuperLiga players
Expatriate footballers in Serbia
Ukrainian expatriate sportspeople in Serbia
Association football midfielders
OFK Grbalj players
Footballers from Zaporizhzhia